Douglas Flat (formerly, Douglasflat and Douglass Flat) is an unincorporated community in Calaveras County, California. The community is in ZIP code 95229 and area code 209.

Douglas Flat was a roaring mining camp of the early 1850s. In 1857 the Harper and Lone Star Claims produced $130,000 worth of gold. The so-called Central Hill Channel, an ancient river deposit from which vast quantities of gold have been taken, is located here.

The town today is registered as California Historical Landmark #272.

The first post office opened in 1879, and was closed for a time in 1891 before reopening.  The town's name honors Tom Douglas, an 1850s merchant.

Politics

References

External links

Unincorporated communities in California
Unincorporated communities in Calaveras County, California
California Historical Landmarks